Jadrien Ford Steele (born November 22, 1974 in New York City) is an American actor, author, and film director. As an author, he writes under the name J M Steele.

Biography
Steele graduated from Princeton University, and later obtained a master's degree in Cinematography at the University of Southern California. He is the son of two New Yorkers, Walanne Steele (a broker) and Jerry Steele (an academic). As an infant he was cast in the long-running television soap opera Ryan's Hope as the Little John Ryan from 1975 to 1985 when he turned 11 years old. Steele received his first major role the following year, playing Jerry Fox in the film The Mosquito Coast, where he starred alongside Harrison Ford, Helen Mirren, and River Phoenix. He married Sarah Elizabeth Bagley in 2009.

Authorship
Steele has written two books for young adult readers. He has also written several short plays. One of these, "Silent Mercury", was made into a short film, which Steele himself directed, and premiered at the 2001 Sundance Film Festival. In 2008 he both directed and acted in his own production of another of his short dramas, "Just Make Believe".

Filmography

Cinema
 The Mosquito Coast (1986) - Jerry
 Approaching Union Square (2006) - Brad's Friend (segment "The Ex-Girlfiriend")
 Just Make Believe (2008, Short) - Gavin
 Victoriana (2012) - Tim Becker

Television
 Ryan's Hope (1975-1985) - Little John Ryan
 The Hogan Family (1 episode, 1986) - Max
 Crossbow (1 episode, 1987) - Simon
 The Secret Garden (1987, TV Movie) - Colin Craven
 American Playhouse (1 episode, 1988) - Gordon Aged 11
 A Father's Homecoming (1988, TV Movie) - Miles

As director
 "Silent Mercury" (2001)
 "Just Make Believe" (2008)
 "Winter Fugue'" (2010)

Bibliography
 The Taker (as J M Steele, 2006) 
 The Market (as J M Steele, 2008)

References

1974 births
Male actors from New York (state)
American male child actors
American male film actors
American male television actors
Living people